Dr. Deborah Ann Travis "D. Ann" Honeycutt (born August 8, 1947) is an American politician and medical doctor.  Honeycutt was the Republican Party nominee in Georgia's 13th congressional district in 2006 and 2008. She attended the 2008 Republican National Convention. In 2004, Honeycutt was President of the Georgia Academy of Family Physicians and in 2005 she served as Chairman of the Board of Directors of the Georgian Academy.

Background
Honeycutt is a board certified family medicine physician who earned university and professional degrees from the University of Illinois School of Medicine and Family Practice Residency Program. She is the past Medical Director of Spelman College Health Services.

Honeycutt has also served as Medical Director at the Good Shepherd Clinic, the free clinic in Morrow.  She practiced medicine at the offices of Georgia Baptist Family Doctor in Palmetto, Georgia and had a solo private practice at Five Points Family Practice in Fairburn, Georgia.

She served a five-year appointment to the American Academy of Family Physicians Commission on Education.  He currently is the Georgia State Delegate to the American Academy.

Her husband is Dr. Andrew Honeycutt, a Harvard University Doctor of Business Administration and Distinguished Professor of Business at Shorter University.

Congressional races
In 2006, Honeycutt was the Republican nominee and lost by 38 percent in Georgia's 13th Congressional District congressional elections. Honeycutt raised $1,337,777, of which $1,326,777 came from individuals and $11,000 from political action committees. Most of the money she raised went to BMW Direct, a Washington direct-mail firm that works for Republican candidates.

In 2008, Honeycutt was again defeated by incumbent David Scott in the 13th Congressional district, despite an edge in fundraising. Honeycutt raised over $4.7 million to her opponent's $1.1 million, yet lost 69 percent to 31 percent. She had run unopposed in the Republican primary.

In 2010, unlike 2006 and 2008, there were several candidates competing for the Republican nomination for the 13th Congressional District. Honeycutt came in second in the primary, and lost to frontrunner Mike Crane in the runoff election that followed. Crane in turn lost to incumbent David Scott.

References

External links
 Official Campaign Site
 Official Blog
 Facebook Profile
 Twitter Page
 

1947 births
Living people
Georgia (U.S. state) Republicans
African-American people in Georgia (U.S. state) politics
African-American women in politics
Women in Georgia (U.S. state) politics
People from Morrow, Georgia
People from Fulton County, Georgia
21st-century African-American people
21st-century African-American women
20th-century African-American people
20th-century African-American women